Palmyra Municipal Airport  is a public use airport in Jefferson County, Wisconsin, United States. Owned by and located in the Town of Palmyra, it is also known as Palmyra Airport. It is included in the Federal Aviation Administration (FAA) National Plan of Integrated Airport Systems for 2021–2025, in which it is categorized as a local general aviation facility.

History 

Palmyra Municipal Airport has been owned and operated by the town of Palmyra since 1948.

In 2013, the Village of Palmyra proposed annexation of more than 740 acres of property, primarily agricultural land, but also including the Town of Palmyra's town hall and the Palmyra Municipal Airport. The Town of Palmyra is challenging the village's annexation attempt.

Facilities and aircraft 
The airport covers an area of 115 acres (46 ha) at an elevation of 851 feet (259 m) above mean sea level. It has one runway designated 9/27 with a turf surface measuring 2,800 by 200 feet (853 x 61 m).

For the twelve month period ending July 22, 2022, the airport had 14,000 general aviation aircraft operations, an average of 38 per day. In January 2023, there were 54 aircraft based at this airport: 53 single-engine and 1 helicopter.

See also 
 List of airports in Wisconsin

References

External links 

 Aerial image from USGS The National Map

Airports in Wisconsin
Buildings and structures in Jefferson County, Wisconsin